Putinci is a village in Serbia. It is situated in the Ruma municipality, in the Srem District, Vojvodina province. The village has a Serb ethnic majority and its population numbering 3,244 people (2002 census).

Name
The name of the town in Serbian is plural.

Historical population

1961: 3,029
1971: 2,938
1981: 3,075
1991: 2,890
2002: 3,244

See also
List of places in Serbia
List of cities, towns and villages in Vojvodina

References
Slobodan Ćurčić, Broj stanovnika Vojvodine, Novi Sad, 1996.

Gallery

External links

Putinci

Populated places in Syrmia
Populated places in Srem District
Ruma